Stolz is a German surname. Notable people with the surname include:

 Alban Stolz (1808–1883), German theologian
 Alexander Stolz (born 1983), German football goalkeeper
 Daniel Stolz von Stolzenberg (Daniel Stolcius) (1600–1660), Bohemian physician and writer on alchemy
 Denny Stolz, U.S. football coach
 Dominik Stolz (born 1990), German footballer playing for Luxembourgish side F91 Dudelange 
 Friedrich Stolz (1860–1936), German chemist
 Hilde von Stolz (1903–1973), Austrian-German actress
 Jordan Stolz (born 2004), American speed skater
 Joseph Stolz (1861–1941), American rabbi
 Kim Stolz (born 1983), U.S. fashion model and television personality
 Mary Stolz (1920–2006), U.S. writer of young adult fiction
 Monika Stolz (born 1951), German politician
 Otto Stolz (1842–1905), Austrian mathematician (Stolz–Cesàro theorem)
 Otto Stolz (1881–1957), Austrian historian
 Robert Stolz (1880–1975), Austrian composer and conductor
 Sylvia Stolz (born 1963), German lawyer and Holocaust denier
 Teresa Stolz (1834–1902), Italian opera soprano of Czech descent

See also

Stolze (disambiguation)
Stoltz (disambiguation)

German-language surnames